Milo De Angelis (born 1951) is an Italian language poet. He is the author of several books of poetry, as well as a volume of stories and one of essays. He has also published translations of several modern French authors and Greek classics.

He was born in Milan in 1951.

His first collection of poetry was entitled Somiglianze (1976). He won the Cilento Poetry Prize in 2018. In 2020 he adheres to Empathism.

References

Published works

Poetry
 Somiglianze (Resemblances), Guanda, Parma, 1975 (new ed. 1990)
 Millimetri (Millimetres), Einaudi, Torino, 1983
 Terra del viso (Face's Land), Mondadori, Milano, 1985
 Distante un padre (An Aloof Father), Mondadori, Milano, 1989
 Biografia sommaria (Concise Biography), Mondadori, Milano, 1998
 Dove eravamo già stati. Poesie 1970-2001 (Where We Had Already Been. Poems 1970-2001), Donzelli, Rome, 2001
 Tema dell’addio (Farewell Theme), Mondadori, Milano, 2005 (Viareggio Prize, San Pellegrino Prize, Cattafi Prize)

Prose
 La corsa dei mantelli (The Cloaks Race), Guanda, Parma, 1979
 Poesia e destino (Poetry and Fate), Cappelli, Bologna, 1982

Translations
 Milo De Angelis, Terre du visage, trans. I. N. Para, Chopard, Paris, 1988.
 Milo De Angelis, Ce que je raconte aux chaises, trans. A. Pilia and J. Demarcq, Luzarches, Les Cahiers de Royaumont, 1989.
 Milo De Angelis, Finite Intuition. Selected Poetry and Prose, trans. Lawrence Venuti, Sun and Moon, New York, 1995.
 Milo De Angelis, Between the Blast Furnaces and the Dizziness: A Selection of Poems: 1970-1999, trans. Emanuel di Pasquale, Chelsea, New York, 2003.
 Milo De Angelis, Theme of Farewell and After-Poems: A Bilingual Edition, ed. and trans. by Susan Stewart and Patrizio Ceccagnoli, University of Chicago Press, Chicago, 2013.

1951 births
Living people
Italian poets
Italian male poets
Translators to Italian
Translators from French
Greek–Italian translators
Writers from Milan
Viareggio Prize winners